The Ministry of Peace is an Ethiopian government ministry created in 2018 that aims to encourage peace processes to prevent and resolve armed conflict in Ethiopia and to support equitable development among the Regions of Ethiopia.

Creation
The Ministry of Peace evolved from the Ministry of Federal Affairs, established in 2001, which initially was responsible for "regional affairs" and "urban development". In 2005, urban development was removed from the ministry's tasks. In 2009, the ministry gained more powers in handling religions, with the aim of encouraging tolerance between people of different religions. In 2010, the ministry gained powers related to registering charities and societies, and to "possession or use of arms, fire arms and explosives".

In October 2018, the Ministry of Peace was re-created as a new ministry, aiming to promote "peace, democracy and development" and to "focus on maintaining law and order, and create political unity among [the peoples] of the nation".

Leadership
Muferiat Kamil was appointed the first Minister of Peace, in October 2018. She was succeeded by Binalf Andualem in October 2021.

Responsibilities
In its new form as the Ministry of Peace, the ministry's direct responsibilities in October 2018 included:
 National Intelligence and Security Service (NISS);
 Information Network Security Agency (INSA);
 Federal Police Commission;
 Federal and Pastoralist Development Affairs;
 National Disaster Risk Management Commission;
 Administration for Refugee and Returnee Affairs;
 Main Department for Immigration and Nationality Affairs.

Actions
In December 2020, to help solve the Metekel conflict, the Ministry of Peace planned to coordinate the creation of a reconciliation committee consisting of people from the Benishangul-Gumuz and Amhara Regions.

Also in December 2020, the Ministry of Peace signed an agreement with the German development agency GIZ to "expand access to drought-stricken communities", to provide peacekeeping and conflict resolution training to women and youth, and to "create joint development" in the border area between Benishangul-Gumuz Region on the Ethiopian side and the state of Blue Nile on the Sudanese side.

References

External links
 Official website (offline)

Government ministries of Ethiopia
2018 establishments in Ethiopia
Ethiopia